The Aviation Bowl was a post-season college football bowl game played at Welcome Stadium in Dayton, Ohio, on December 9, 1961, between the New Mexico Lobos and the Western Michigan Broncos. New Mexico won by a score of 28 to 12. Attendance for the game was 3,694.

Background
The Lobos finished tied for third for Mountain States Conference in their final season in the conference. The Broncos had finished tied for second in the Mid-American Conference. This was New Mexico's first bowl game since the 1947 Harbor Bowl and Western Michigan's first ever bowl game. Rutgers and The Citadel were asked to play in the game, but they both declined. Bowling Green was considered to play, but they instead played in the Mercy Bowl, a fundraiser in memory of the members of the Cal Poly team members that died the year before, after playing Bowling Green. Ohio was in the running as well, but they tied their last game against Western Michigan, 20–20. The two inch snowfall that fell prior to the game turned to sleet during the game, making the field wet.

Game summary
 New Mexico - Cromartie 3 yard touchdown run (kick blocked)
 New Mexico - Santiago 10 yard touchdown run (Morgan run)
 Western Michigan - White 4 yard touchdown run (run failed)
 New Mexico - Morgan 10 yard touchdown run (run failed)
 New Mexico - Cummings 43 yard interception for touchdown (Bradford run)
 Western Michigan - Cooke 5 yard touchdown pass from Chlebek (pass failed)

Statistics

Aftermath
New Mexico did not win another bowl game until the 2007 New Mexico Bowl.

Game officials

See also
List of college bowl games

References 

Defunct college football bowls
History of Dayton, Ohio
New Mexico Lobos football bowl games
Western Michigan Broncos football bowl games
1961 in sports in Ohio
December 1961 sports events in the United States
1961–62 NCAA football bowl games